is a Japanese manga series written and illustrated by Yuuki Kodama and serialized in Young Ace. It follows Staz, a vampire from the surreal Demon World, who meets Fuyumi Yanagi, an ordinary Japanese high school girl who accidentally wanders into the Demon World through a portal. Shortly after their meeting Fuyumi is killed by a carnivorous plant and turned into a ghost, causing Staz to take responsibility and pledge to help bring her back to life. An anime adaptation aired between July and September 2013.

In North America, the manga has been licensed for an English language release by Yen Press. The anime series has been licensed by Viz Media for streaming on their website VizAnime and home video distribution in 2014. Neon Alley also acquired the series for streaming on their web service.

Plot
Staz is a powerful vampire boss of a territory in the Demon World. Unlike his vampire ancestors, he prefers not to prey on humans, and would rather indulge in their Japanese otaku lifestyle of reading manga, watching anime, and playing video games. One day, he becomes excited when Fuyumi Yanagi, an ordinary Japanese high school girl, accidentally wanders into the Demon World through a portal. The two's first meeting is cut short by the attack of a demon who challenges his territory. When Staz goes to stop the demon, Fuyumi is killed by a carnivorous plant and turned into a ghost. Staz takes responsibility and pledges to help bring her back to life. When they take the portal, they learn that Fuyumi needs to drink Staz's blood in order to not fade away. They meet Hydra Bell, a treasure hunter who reveals her ability to open and close the portal was stolen, and that in order to restore Fuyumi they need the Book of Resurrection.

After challenging his friend Wolf, who is the boss of Demon World West, he learns that Bell has the Book, but that Staz needs to get his big brother Braz to interpret it for him. Braz agrees to interpret the book provided that Staz stops Papradon Akim, a creature who tears his fallen enemies apart and uses their body parts to improve himself and his abilities. Meanwhile, Wolf and scientist Franken Stein (who created Akim) try to find a substitute to keep Fuyumi from fading. After Wolf fights Akim and Staz defeats Akim, Braz recruits Franken Stein to secretly work on another creature.

Fuyumi is taken by Bell's brother Knell and delivered to their mother Neyn, who reveals that she is the fusion of the mother of Bell and the mother of Fuyumi, making the two girls sisters. Neyn asks Staz whether he is going to care for Fuyumi, which Staz agrees, so she releases him, only to later send a team of assassins called Team Fearless to hunt down Staz. Meanwhile, the Demon World Acropolis police officers Beros and Goyle arrest Braz for conspiring to overthrow the king of the demon world, Wolf Daddy. Braz escapes but agrees to deliver to Wolf Daddy a challenger to the throne. He places Akim's heart in the body of his late father and former king Richarz and revives him. However Richarz is no mood to fight Wolf Daddy.

Braz and Staz learn that Richarz and Wolf Daddy had sealed up the essence of the demon king Herrschaft Grimm behind a door, but that it is too powerful. Akim manages to revive and recover his heart, killing Richarz and then absorbing Grimm's essence to become the new king of the Demon World. Wolf Daddy and the gang are forced to escape, while Braz stays on as a servant to Akim. Staz and Wolf want to take the throne back from Akim, so they start training under one of Wolf Daddy's old friends White Step. Akim creates a team of minions to harvest more body parts to grow stronger. To minimize this expansion, Wolf Daddy offers to Akim to fight a group of demons on the black list, a list of criminals who were so powerful they were hidden away and their existence erased from record. Akim agrees, and Wolf Daddy arranges for the blacklisted demons to come and train themselves.

Characters

Main characters
 

 Staz is one of the territory bosses of Demon World East. Although he is the descendant of the noble vampire Dracula who would go to the human world to suck blood, he shows no interest in the vampire lifestyle, preferring to indulge himself in Japanese culture and media. For secondary vampire characteristics, he does not fly or have bat wings, he can eat garlic, he is not susceptible to crosses, and he heals rapidly. He is immediately attracted to Fuyumi, but when she is killed and becomes a ghost, he makes it his mission to bring her back to life. He struggles with his feelings about her, whether it is his desire to suck her dry as a mummy or whether it could be something romantic. In the human world, he carries a spray bottle of his spit that allows him to manipulate the memories of the humans there. He can also revive Fuyumi by giving her some of his blood. He describes his abilities as radiating with a range of up to tens of meters. When he was younger, his brother Braz sealed his full potential power by shooting him with a special bullet. This was because he was unable to handle his power and would collapse in a nose bleed after using the power. He is later freed from the restriction.

 Fuyumi is a Japanese high school girl who got lost in the Demon World after wandering into a portal that had opened in her bedroom. She is eaten by a carnivorous plant demon, and ends up a ghost / demon, leaving behind only her bones and clothes. She wears a characteristic triangular white cloth on her head as a result. She accompanies Staz on his quest to bring her back to life. In the human world, she risks fading away so she must be replenished by Staz's blood or other methods. Prior to her adventures with Staz, she has been living with her father, but the whereabouts of her mother is unknown. When she starts fading in the demon world, Frankie discovers she might have a hybrid of demon attributes. It is later revealed that she and Bell became sisters, as her mother had merged with her doppelgänger counterpart from the demon world when they met each other.

 

 Hydrabell, or Bell for short, is a treasure hunter who is able to travel across dimensions and between the human and demon world using the Black Curtain. She initially appears with a large backpack with scrolls on its pockets. Her goal is to catch the magic thief who stole her ability to put away the Black Curtain that brought Fuyumi into the demon world, and then make that thief her lover-boy. She can teleport people away using a picture frame as the portal, and can spy on people by finger framing like a photographer. Although she determines that Staz is not the magic thief, she grows attracted to Staz, and secretly plans to win his affections. She learns later that Akim, when he was Pantomime, was the magic thief. The Volume 4 extra shows her corresponding with VIPs such as Bill Gates.. It is later revealed that her mother had met her doppelgänger counterpart on Earth and merged, making her and Fuyumi sisters.

 He is the hybrid lycanthrope who controls most of Demon World West. He is Staz's friend and rival, having known each other since Staz ran away from Acropolis. Staz says that Wolf uses his magic to strengthen his own body so he can excel in beating up on an opponent. He is of noble blood and was supposed to live in Acropolis, but admitted that he was abandoned because he is not a pure-blooded werewolf. According to himself, he is "a mix of lycanthrope and nobody". He can assume his fully transformed form for about three minutes, although if not done right, he only partially transforms.

Supporting characters

Demon World East

 Staz's right-hand man. He is often the one leading the gang when outside and patrolling whenever Staz is busy with his Japanese media.

 Saty is the manager of the Third Eye Cafe in the demon world. She and Mamejirou have clairvoyant powers thanks to her third eye. She does not speak, relying on Mamejirou to communicate her thoughts. She is able to stop Staz and Mamejirou from fighting with an intimidating stare.

A three-eyed talking weasel-like demon who works at the Third Eye Cafe along with his partner Saty. He is very talkative. He and Saty have clairvoyant powers. He appears regularly inside the jacket covers for the Japanese graphic novel publications.

 Yoshida is a doppelganger who joins Staz's gang, serving as Staz's double whenever he is away.

Demon World West

 Wolf's underling. He has light hair and wears a black turtleneck.

 Wolf's underling. He wears a knit cap and has dark hair.

A scientist within the Demon World, named after the scientist who had stitched body parts of humans together, and whom he calls his ancestor. He is an expert on demon physiology and conducts experiments on demons. He is interested in experimenting on Fuyumi, He had worked on an experiment to create a supreme body based on stitching together the body parts of demons; the result was Papradon Akim.

Demon World Acropolis

Staz and Liz's older brother. He is the one who wrote the book of resurrection that Staz and the others believe can bring Fuyumi back to life. When they were younger, he conducted experiments on Staz to unlock his true potential. He later sealed Staz's powers away with a magic bullet that he shot into Staz's heart. While his intentions are always under suspicion from Staz, his motive is to dethrone Wolf Daddy's reign as King of Acropolis, since Wolf Daddy had killed his father. He orchestrates the creation of Papradon Akim and has Staz test his strength on him. One of his abilities is to manipulate blood.

 (Japanese); Sherry Lynn (English)
Liz is Braz and Staz's younger sister. She has a great respect for her eldest brother Braz and a deep disdain for her older brother Staz. This is partly because Staz ran away from home and partly because Braz would spend all his time on Staz. She is the jailer of Acropolis and has the power to judge and imprison demons in her own personal dungeon known as Liz's Toy Box.Liz comes to care for Staz and admire him after seeing his real power (that Braz sealed). She takes a liking to Fuyumi after finding that Fuyumi isn't afraid of her or seeking to win her favor.

 Beros is the peacekeeper of the Acropolis Police. She is in the form of a girl wearing a visor cap, a black top and uneven-length shorts for uniform, and she has a tail whose end is a snake head. She uses a collar called an Underdog Choker which restricts the wearer from using magic. Outside of police activities, Beros is part of a music band where she plays bass guitar.

King of the Demon World Acropolis. He is Wolf's biological father and killer of the Blood siblings' father Richarz, the previous king. In the later story, it is revealed that Wolf, Richarz and Heads are good friends, and that he had killed Richarz at the latter's request when he had been infused with Grimm's magic essence. He was part of a secret task force called the Demon Colors under the previous king where he went under the name Red Wolf.

 Captain in the Acropolis. He wears glasses and has a barbed tail. He works with computers. He uses anger to summon and to power up his demon pet creature named Angry Spear. He also has a power called Cool Decision, which lets him freeze his opponent if they touch his head.

He is a monstrosity created by Franken Stein stitched up by the body parts of demons. In order to obtain stronger parts for his body, he escaped from Franken's lab via spatial magic and began hunting and killing demons with exceptional magical properties in order to harvest their limbs. Akim's true form is that of a phantom and he uses magic to manipulate the separate body parts which make up his physical form. Akim's entire creation was orchestrated by Braz, who anonymously delivered a demon corpse to Franken to serve as the central container for Akim. The corpse was later revealed to be a spy from Wolf Daddy named Pantomime. Akim's heart is placed in a new vessel that turns out to be Braz's father Richarz, but Akim is unable to control the body and only serves as a power source to keep the heart beating. Akim later comes back to life, taking the heart out of Richarz's body, and absorbing Grimm's magic to take over Demon World Acropolis.

 A group of assassins sent by Neyn to hunt down Staz. Although they have never actually killed a vampire before, they hope that this would elevate their standing at the Acropolis. They consist of: Shamkid "the leader" who can transform into a cat and can foretell a person's actions after having a piece of their hair; Sam "the veteran" who sports a ponytail and an eyepatch, and wields a katana; Jasmine "the looks"who is dressed as a jiangshi, speaks Chinese, and wields a claw weapon; Roy "the brain" who wears a striped shirt, handles navigation for their team airship, and whose special ability includes falling asleep to enable a "chat room" that allows the team to communicate with each other telepathically; and Rando "the brawn" a mummy who was able to capture Fuyumi inside his body. After Akim takes over the Acropollis, they join Akim's staff as an elite squad where they help cook and clean, while secretly thinking of ways to depose him.

 The father of the Blood siblings. He had lost the throne when he was killed by Wolf Daddy who crushed his heart, but ten years later, he is brought back to life by Braz using Akim's heart. However, Akim is able to grab the heart back. It is revealed that he, his wife and Wolf Daddy were part of the original squad that tried to contain the old king Grimm but he had lost his wife and his heart got corrupted by Grimm's essence, so he asked Wolf Daddy to kill him.

 Kelly and Burgundy are female demon servants created by Akim infused with Akim's Grimm magic and some of the top organs harvested by Akim. Kelly has light hair and dark skin, and dresses with a tank top with a zig-zag stripe, a cheetah animal print wrap skirt and black pants. Burgundy wears a mask, rabbit ears and tail. a single strap top, black bikini bottom, and thigh-high knee socks. Their mission is to scour the Demon World territories and grab the best organs to harvest.

 Amber was created by Akim as another demon to fight with him against the blacklisted demons. He has a mohawk hairstyle. He was rated a little stronger than the two demon girls, but was still unable to beat Akim in their sparring match.

Dimensional Highway
The Dimensional Highway is one of the seven wonders of the demon world. It is described as a labyrinth of countless doors.

 Knell is a transporter and takes on jobs to transport goods to different locations. He is the younger brother of Bell, and fellow spatial magic user. He was born after Neyn had fused so his demon powers are not as strong as Bell's.

 Bell and Knell's mother. She has dark hair, but originally had light hair when Bell was a child. Fourteen years ago, when she met her doppelgänger counterpart in the human world, who happened to be Fuyumi's mother, she fused with her and became one person (she has heterochromia). She had since agreed to live in the demon world with Heads. She and Braz are e-mail friends.

 Heads Hydra is Neyn's husband and Bell and Knell's father. Initially appearing as a flying multi-headed serpent, he assumes a human shape where he typically wears a "I ♥ Neyn" T-shirt and pajamas that he had during their honeymoon.

Other characters

Fuyumi's father. He was aware of the Demon World's existence following his wife's fusion with Neyn and decided to give up being with her to Heads Hydra to instead raise Fuyumi on his own. He has a Demon World counterpart who works as a butler to the Hydra family.

 Wolf's mother and Wolf Daddy's estranged wife. She lives on Earth where she is a school teacher. Although Wolf Daddy covets her powers, Katy says her time on Earth has diminished them so she is willing to teach Wolf how to use his powers so she doesn't have to return to the demon world.

 White Step is a colleague of Wolf Daddy; they were in a secret task force called the Demon Colors under the king. He is a human who has survived in the demon world using his dodging skills and living off the grid. He trains Staz and Wolf in the art of dodging, and agrees to let the Blacklist be exposed if it will protect his demon disciple Pati. He resides in Demon World North.

 White Step's demon disciple who appears as a boy. Although he appears to be rather meek, he transforms into a beast. His name was kept off the Blacklist when it was revealed as part of White Step's negotiations with Wolf Daddy.

 Blacklist demons
 The blacklist demons are ones who are not bounded by any demon territory and have gone off the grid. They are very strong demons that are coveted by Akim. Outside of Pati, Wolf Daddy has brought in the following demons:
 Steel Evil Jack is a blacklisted demon who is regarded as the most notorious criminal in the Demon World. Wherever he goes, there are evacuation alerts. He has gone into prison where he waits for a suitable challenger. He has a special transformation called the Berserker Lurk.
 Shteyn Doji is a blacklisted oni (ogre demon) who once united many ogre tribes. He aspires to be a singer, but his voice knocked out five thousand ogres, that he became despondent and exiled himself to an island. His voice paralyzes opponents to their spot.
 Elforess is a blacklisted elf demon who protects a forest over in Demon World West. No one has ever seen her, prior to her arrival with the blacklist group.

Media

Manga
The manga was written and drawn by Yuuki Kodama and serialized in Young Ace from September 4, 2009 to September 3, 2016 and compiled in 17 volumes. The series was later licensed for distribution in English by Yen Press, alongside its spinoff Bloody Brat. and released as an omnibus edition where each volume contains two of the Japanese volumes of the series, except for the final omnibus edition (volume 9) which contains the final manga volume.

Volumes

Bloody Brat

Anime

The anime is produced by Brain's Base and directed by Shigeyuki Miya, with series composition by Takeshi Konuta, character designs by Kenji Fujisaki, art direction by Masaki Mayuzumi and Toshiyuki Sakae and sound direction by Satoki Iida. The 10 episode series began airing on July 7, 2013 on tvk and were later aired on Tokyo MX, Sun TV and BS11. The series has been licensed in North America by Viz Media for streaming on their online service Viz Anime, which was revealed at Anime Expo 2013 along with streaming by Neon Alley and home video release in 2014. The opening theme is "ViViD" by May'n whilst the ending theme is "Bloody Holic" by Yuuka Nanri.

Reception
The manga had sold over 1.8 million copies as of March 2015. Spick Mich from Spickmich reviewed the German version of Blood Lad, stating that the manga's art style occasionally reminded him of Soul Eater and that fans of action and horror would like the series. Bamboo Dong from Anime News Network praised the anime adaptation, finding its humor appealing as well as the portrayal of the main character Staz.

Works cited
  "Ch." and "Vol." is shortened form for chapter and volume of the collected Blood Lad manga. Volume numbering follows the Japanese version and not the omnibus one.
  "Ep." is shortened form for episode and refers to an episode number of the collected Blood Lad anime.

References

External links
 Anime official website (archive) 
 Blood Lad at Kadokawa Shoten 
 

2009 manga
2010s black comedy television series
2013 anime television series debuts
Action anime and manga
Anime and manga about werewolves
Anime series based on manga
Brain's Base
Dark comedy anime and manga
Kadokawa Dwango franchises
Kadokawa Shoten manga
Manga adapted into television series
Medialink
Seinen manga
Shōjo manga
Television series about werewolves
Vampires in animated television
Vampires in anime and manga
Viz Media anime
Yen Press titles